Death Is Infinite is the second EP by the American metalcore band Himsa and is the first recording with lead singer John Pettibone.

Track listing 
"Born to Conquer" – 2:50
"Another Version of Twist" – 1:32
"Hellbent and Hammered" – 3:07
"Exhale" – 2:34
"10 Seconds to Orgasm" -0:10
"Tempest in Seconds" (Live) - 4:02

2001 EPs
Himsa albums